Society Against the State is a 1974 ethnography of power relations in South American rainforest native cultures written by anthropologist Pierre Clastres and best known for its thesis that tribal societies reject the centralization of coercive power. Clastres challenged the idea that all cultures evolve through Westernization to adopt coercive leadership as a popular, ethnocentric myth.

Further reading

External links 
 

1974 non-fiction books
French-language books
Anthropology books
Ethnographic literature